Middleboro   is a community in the Canadian province of Nova Scotia, located in  Cumberland County .

References
Middleboro on Destination Nova Scotia

Communities in Cumberland County, Nova Scotia
General Service Areas in Nova Scotia